The  is the second-tallest building in Shinjuku, Tokyo. It was designed by Kenzo Tange and completed in 1994.

Floors 1 to 8 are occupied by retail stores, floors 9 to 37 are office floors and floors 39 to 52 are occupied by the luxury Park Hyatt Tokyo hotel, which includes a swimming pool with panoramic views on the city.

The building is owned and managed by Tokyo Gas Urban Development, a subsidiary of Tokyo Gas, and was constructed on the site of a decommissioned gas storage facility. Tokyo Gas operates a regional cooling center on-site, which provides heating and cooling to the high-rise district of Nishi-Shinjuku, and supplies electricity to the adjacent Tokyo Metropolitan Government Building.

Floor Directory

Tenants 

 L'Oreal
 Tokyo Gas

In media 

 The Park Hyatt Tokyo hotel atop the building was the main setting of the Sofia Coppola film Lost In Translation.
 The building was depicted as being destroyed by a UFO in the film Godzilla 2000.

See also 
 List of tallest structures in Tokyo

References

External links
Shinjuku Park Tower: Outline
Shinjuku Park Tower: Statistics

Office buildings completed in 1994
Skyscrapers in Shinjuku
Skyscraper office buildings in Tokyo
Skyscraper hotels in Tokyo
Hyatt Hotels and Resorts
Retail buildings in Tokyo
1994 establishments in Japan